Porro Bluff is a bluff lying south of Birdsend Bluff and overlooking Errera Channel on the Danco Coast, western Graham Land, Antarctica. Shown on an Argentine government chart of 1950. Named by the United Kingdom Antarctic Place-Names Committee (UK-APC) in 1960 for Ignazio Porro (1795–1875), Italian engineer who in 1851 invented a prism combination, important in the development of stereo-plotting instruments.

See also
Orel Ice Fringe

References

Cliffs of Graham Land
Danco Coast